Zanat (also Romanized as Zanāt; also known as Belādarzī, Belād-e Rāẕī, and Belāderzī) is a village in Abdoliyeh-ye Sharqi Rural District, in the Central District of Ramshir County, Khuzestan Province, Iran. At the 2006 census, its population was 15, in 4 families.

References 

Populated places in Ramshir County